Konstantin Fring (born 9 January 1990) is a German footballer who plays as a midfielder for side TSV Schott Mainz.

With Rot-Weiss Essen Fring won the Lower Rhine Cup in 2015.

External links
 
 

1990 births
Living people
People from Bad Kreuznach
German footballers
Footballers from Rhineland-Palatinate
Association football midfielders
3. Liga players
1. FSV Mainz 05 II players
Borussia Dortmund II players
Rot-Weiss Essen players
BFV Hassia Bingen players
TSV Schott Mainz players